The following is a list of anarchist musicians, which details the instruments such musicians use, musical genres they perform, and, if applicable, bands they are members of.

An anarchist is a person who rejects formalized hierarchy and supports its elimination. Anarchism is a political philosophy that advocates self-governed societies with voluntary institutions.
This list only deals with individual, self-identified anarchists who are musicians. Musicians who have not self-identified as anarchists are not included; nor are bands and music collectives who collectively identify as anarchist, although individual members thereof may be.

A
 Jude Abbott: English singer; performs punk rock; member of anarcho-punk band Chumbawamba (1996—2012)
 Sid Ation: English drummer; performs punk rock; former member of Flux Of Pink Indians
 Sherman Austin (1983—present): American rapper; performs hip hop music

B
 Louise Bell: English guitarist; performs punk rock; former member of Flux Of Pink Indians
 Pascal Benvenuti (1980—present): French singer and bass, guitar, drums, ukulele, mandolin, and concertina player; performs jazz punk and folk punk music; current member of Les Louise Mitchels and occasional member of anarcho-punk/folk punk band Ghost Mice (2002—present)
 Derek Birkett: English bassist; performs punk rock; former member of Flux Of Pink Indians
 Björk: Icelandic singer and songwriter; prominent purveyor of art pop; involved in anarcho-punk and anarchist poetry during the 1980s; aligned with the anarchist Crass Collective as part of post-punk group KUKL; signed to One Little Indian since the 1980s, set up by members of various anarcho-punk bands.
 Johnny Blackburn: English bassist; performs punk rock; member of anarcho-punk band Omega Tribe
 James Bowman (14 May 1981—present): American guitarist and singer; performs punk rock and folk rock; member of band Against Me! (2000—present)
 Georges Brassens (1921—1981): French singer, songwriter, and guitarist; performed folk music
Bob Brozman (8 Mar 1954 – 23 Apr 2013): American blues and world guitarist and ethnomusicologist; described himself in an OC-TV program as a "guitarist, anarchist, anthropologist"
 Dunstan Bruce: English singer; performs punk rock; member of anarcho-punk band Chumbawamba
 Graham Burnett (1960—present): English drummer; performed punk rock and post-punk; former member of Stripey Zebras (1980—1981), Autumn Poison (1980—1985), and Love Over Law

C
 John Cage (1912—1992): American composer; composed chance and experimental music
 Neil Campau (1980—present): American guitarist, autoharpist, and singer; former member of World History and current member of Electrician
 Daniel Carter (1945—present): American saxophonist, flautist, clarinetist, and trumpeter; performs free jazz
 Pat Carter: English vocalist; performs punk rock; member of anarcho-punk band Omega Tribe

 Holger Czukay (1938—2017): German composer and bassist; performs krautrock and experimental music; member of the "anarchist community" Can

D
 Lance D'Boyle: English drummer; performed punk rock; former member of Poison Girls (??-1995)
 Fabrizio De Andre (1940—1999): Italian singer-songwriter
 Josh Dies: Lead singer of American hardcore band Showbread
 Mavis Dillon: English trumpeter; performed punk rock; former member of anarcho-punk band Chumbawamba (—1995)
 Peter Dolving: Swedish vocalist; performed thrash metal; member of thrash metal band The Haunted

E
 Robert Eggplant
 Andrew Eldritch
 Dave Ellesmere: English drummer; performs punk rock; former member of Flux Of Pink Indians

F
 Richard Famous: English singer and guitarist; performed punk rock; former member of Poison Girls (1978–1995)
  Neil Ferguson: English bassist and audio engineer; performs punk rock; member of Chumbawamba
 Léo Ferré (24 August 1916 – 14 July 1993): French singer-songwriter, poet, composer, orchestra conductor and pianist; one of France's most well-known and influential singers; a self-proclaimed anarchist who sang irreverent and highly confrontational songs
 Phil Free: English guitarist; performed punk rock, hardcore punk, and art punk; former member of anarcho-punk band Crass
 Sheena Fulton: English singer; performed punk rock and post-punk; former member of Stripey Zebras (1980—1981) and Autumn Poison (1980—1985)

G
 Patricio García (28 Oct 1977—present): Argentinian composer; former member of rock band Los Chicles (1995–2002), writes music for film.
 Laura Jane Grace (8 Nov 1980—present): American guitarist and vocalist of punk rock band Against Me!
 Graham: English drummer; performs punk rock; former member of anarcho-punk band The Mob (1979–1983)
 Eric Green (19 January 1993—present): American guitarist and vocalist for California-based emo/post-hardcore band Problem Dog. Previously a member of anarcho-punk/folk punk band Danny Discord and the Misanthropists (2012–2015).

H
 Harry Hamer: English drummer; performs punk rock; member of anarcho-punk band Chumbawamba
 Gene Hugh: English guitarist; performs punk rock; member of anarcho-punk band Omega Tribe
Kevin Hunter: English guitarist; performs punk rock; former member of Flux Of Pink Indians
Eugene Hutz: Ukrainian singer; performs gypsy punk, member of Gogol Bordello

I
 Steve Ignorant: English singer; performed punk rock, hardcore punk, and art punk; former member of anarcho-punk bands Crass, Schwartzeneggar, Stratford Mercenaries, Current 93, Thought Crime and Paranoid Visions

J
 Darren Johns: British singer, guitarist, lyricist and composer; performs punk rock, Americana and folk-roots; current member of Crazy Arm (2005–present) and Warshy (2017-present).
 Chris Johnston ("Chris Clavin"): American guitarist, singer, and harmonicist; performs pop punk and folk punk music; former member of pop-punk band The Devil Is Electric (2000—2003); current member of anarcho-punk/folk punk band Ghost Mice (2002—present)
  Hannah Jones: American violinist and singer; performs pop punk and folk punk music; former member of pop-punk band The Devil Is Electric (2000—2003) and current member of anarcho-punk/folk punk band Ghost Mice (2002—present)

K
 Michael Karoli (1948—2001): German guitarist and violinist; performed krautrock and experimental music; former member of the "anarchist community" Can
 Tim Kelly: English guitarist; performs punk rock; former member of Flux Of Pink Indians
 Ian "Lemmy" Kilmister (1945—2015): English singer, bassist, guitarist, and harmonicist; performs Rock 'N' Roll, space rock, and punk rock; has associated with various acts, including Motörhead, Hawkwind, Ramones, and The Rockin' Vickers

L
 Nomy Lamm (1976—present): American singer-songwriter; performs punk rock, and queercore; liner notes of her debut album, Anthem, state that she is an anarchist
 Colin Latter: English singer; performs punk rock; former member of Flux Of Pink Indians
 Eve Libertine: English singer; performed punk rock, hardcore punk, and art punk; former member of anarcho-punk band Crass
 Jaki Liebezeit (1939—2017): German drummer; performs free jazz, krautrock and experimental music; member of the "anarchist community" Can, who suggested the backronym "communism, anarchism, nihilism" for the band's name
 Austin Lunn: American vocalist, guitarist and drummer; sole member of the band Panopticon, and has also been a member of several other bands as various roles.

M

 Andy Martin
Terence McKenna: ethnobotanist and philosopher; spoken word on Alien Dreamtime with Spacetime Continuum & Stephen Kent
 Efrim Menuck: Canadian guitarist and singer involved with the bands Godspeed You! Black Emperor and Thee Silver Mt. Zion Memorial Orchestra
 Simon Middlehurst: English guitarist; performs punk rock; former member of Flux Of Pink Indians
 Marc Mob: English guitarist and singer; performs punk rock; former member of anarcho-punk band The Mob (1979–1983)

N
 Nikolas Asimos (20 August 1949 – 17 March 1988): Greek composer and singer
 Nil Wright English (1952—present): bassist and electric violinist; performed punk rock; former member of Poison Girls (1980–1995)
 Danbert Nobacon (1958—present): English singer and keyboardist; performs punk rock and folk rock; former member of anarcho-punk band Chumbawamba
 Alice Nutter: English singer and percussionist; performs punk rock; former member of anarcho-punk band Chumbawamba

O
 Joey Only: guitarist and singer; performs folk punk music

P
 Pabodie's Drilling Apparatus: American musician based out of Iowa.
N. A. Palmer: English guitarist; performed punk rock, hardcore punk, and art punk; former member of anarcho-punk band Crass
Pat "The Bunny" Schneeweis: American singer, songwriter, guitarist, and trumpet player; Formerly lead anarcho-punk/folk groups Johnny Hobo and the Freight Trains, Wingnut Dishwashers Union, and Ramshackle Glory, as well as a solo career. Retired from music in February 2016, due to a change in ideologies
 Erik Petersen: singer, songwriter, and guitarist for Philadelphia anarcho-punk band Mischief Brew
 Utah Phillips (1935—2008): American singer, poet, storyteller and guitarist; performed folk music and spoken word; retired on 11 October 2007, due to poor health, before passing away on 23 May 2008
 Matty Pop Chart: American accordionist and drummer; performs folk punk music; occasional member of anarcho-punk/folk punk band Ghost Mice (2002—present)
 Josef Porta: English guitarist, drummer, and singer; performs punk rock; former member of anarcho-punk band The Mob (1979—1983), Blyth Power (1983—present), and Zounds (1977—1982, 2001—present)
 POS: American rapper, guitarist, vocalist; performs hip-hop and punk rock; founding member of indie hip hop collective Doomtree; guitarist and vocalist in the punk band build better bombs; vocalist and keyboardist for noise band Marijuana Deathsquads 
 Promoe (1976—present): Swedish rapper; performs hip hop; member of rap group Looptroop
 Neil Puncher: English guitarist; performs punk rock; former member of Flux Of Pink Indians

R
Bernhardt Rebours: English bassist, synthesizer player, and pianist; performed punk rock; former member of Poison Girls (??—1995)
 Wesley Richards: American songwriter, guitarist and singer; writes and performs with the anarcho-metal band Fortunate Fall (band) and also with the anarcho-punk band Dr. Ghost
 Lily Richeson: American cellist; performs folk punk music; occasional member of anarcho-punk/folk punk band Ghost Mice (2002—present)
 Penny Rimbaud: English drummer; performed punk rock, hardcore punk, and art punk; former member of anarcho-punk band Crass
Zack de la Rocha, vocalist of Rage Against the Machine. Performs; Hip Hop, Rock, Nu Metal, Punk Rock, Metal
 David Rovics (1967—present): American singer, guitarist, and songwriter; performs folk music

S
 Chicho Sánchez Ferlosio (1940—2003): leftist militant Spanish singer-songwriter whose politics gradually moved from communism to anarchism.
 Timothy Laszlo Sandor (1974—present) a.k.a. "Platinum Bitch": American experimental / indie folk composer and engineer; great-nephew of Hungarian-American pianist Gyorgy Sandor; founding member of the Philadelphia-based music collective Leader Clears the Lunar
 Irmin Schmidt (1937—present): German keyboardist; plays krautrock and experimental music and composes film scores; member of Can who described the group as an "anarchist community"
Pete Seeger: had many anarchist and communist beliefs
  Andrew Seward: American bassist and singer; performs punk rock and folk rock; member of anarcho-punk band Against Me! (2002–present)
Otep Shamaya (1979—present): American metal musician, singer-songwriter and lyricist/poet
 Andy Smith: English guitarist; performs punk rock; former member of Flux Of Pink Indians
 Sole: American rapper and producer
 Scott Sturgeon: also known as Stza Crack of the New York City anarcho-punk band Leftöver Crack
 Vi Subversa (1935—2016): English singer-songwriter, and guitarist; performed punk rock; former member of Poison Girls (1978—1995)

T
 Scott Thomas: English drummer; performs punk rock; member of anarcho-punk band Omega Tribe
 Tõnu Trubetsky (1963—present): Estonian singer and poet; performs punk rock; member of punk band Vennaskond
 Kevin Tucker: American vocalist and guitarist of the anarcho-primitivist death metal band Peregrine

V
 Gee Vaucher: English pianist; also created album cover art and stage montages; performed punk rock, hardcore punk, and art punk; former member of anarcho-punk band Crass
 Boris Vian: French poet, musician, writer, described as a "soft anarchist" by his wife, Ursula Kübler.
 Joy De Vivre: English singer; performed punk rock, hardcore punk, and art punk; former member of anarcho-punk band Crass

W
 Jason Walsh: English guitarist; performs punk rock; member of anarcho-punk band Omega Tribe
 Lou Watts: English singer and keyboardist; performs punk rock; member of anarcho-punk band Chumbawamba
 Dorian Wallace (1985—present): American composer and pianist.
 Greg Wells: American vocalist (described as "howling and breathing"); performs folk punk music; occasional member of anarcho-punk/folk punk band Ghost Mice (2002—present)
 Boff Whalley: English guitarist and singer; performs punk rock and folk; member of anarcho-punk band Chumbawamba and founding member of Commoners Choir.
 Chris Willsher (1971—present): English drummer, singer, songwriter; performs punk rock; member of Bus Station Loonies and former member of Oi Polloi and Disorder
Martin Wilson: English drummer; performs punk rock; former member of Flux of Pink Indians
 Pete Wright: English bassist and singer; performed punk rock, hardcore punk, and art punk; former member of anarcho-punk band Crass

Y
Gino Srdjan Yevdjevich: former Yugoslav vocalist of gypsy punk band Kultur Shock
 Curtis Youé: English bassist; performs punk rock; former member of anarcho-punk band The Mob (1979–1983) and Blyth Power (1983–??)

Z
ZSK: German punk-rock band

See also
List of anarcho-punk bands
List of crust punk bands
Music and politics

References

Anarchist music
Anarchists
Musicians
Lists of musicians
Lists of people by ideology